Scarlet Pages is a 1930 pre-Code American crime drama film with songs starring Elsie Ferguson and directed by Ray Enright. It was produced and distributed by First National Pictures, a subsidiary of Warner Bros. The film stars Elsie Ferguson, John Halliday, Grant Withers and Marian Nixon. Scarlet Pages is based on a 1929 Broadway play of the same name that Ferguson also starred in. It is similar in theme to the better remembered Five Star Final, also by Warners released a year later. The film simultaneously marked the first time Ferguson appeared in a sound film and the last film she ever made.

Plot
In the prologue to the film (taking place in 1911) we learn that, being unable to care for her baby, Mary Bancroft (Elsie Ferguson), had to give her up for adoption. Years later (in 1930), we find Bancroft as a successful female lawyer in New York. She refuses to marry District Attorney John Remington (John Halliday), because she doesn't want to tell him about her unfortunate past.

Bancroft and Remington go to a nightclub one night where Nora Mason (Marian Nixon) works as a singer and dancer. Nora Mason is actually Bancroft's biological daughter but neither of them knows it. Although Nora is tired of the work she is doing and wants to settle down and marry Robert Lawrence (Grant Withers), her adoptive "father" Dr. Henry Mason (played by Wilbur Mack) has other plans for her. Dr. Mason wants to sell Nora to Gregory Jackson (William B. Davidson), who promises to star Nora in a lucrative show, as long as she gives herself to Jackson.

When Nora hears of this sordid deal from the lips of Dr. Mason, she kills him with a gun her adoptive "mother"(Charlotte Walker) has recently bought. Lawrence, with a friend who is an acquaintance of Bancroft's, goes to the office of Bancroft to ask her to defend Nora. At first reluctant, Bancroft finally decides to take the case. Nora at first refuses to tell the reasons for killing her adoptive father Dr. Mason until it comes out in court that she has been adopted. Nora then informs the jury the entire details of what had occurred prior to the murder; it is obliquely stated that she had been molested by Dr. Mason. When Bancroft finds out her client is actually her own daughter she passes out in court. Nora is acquitted and eventually forgives her real mother for abandoning her as a child.

Cast

Songs
 "I'm Walking on Air" Sung by Marian Nixon and Chorus (written by Archie Gottler and George W. Meyer)

Preservation
The film survives intact and has been preserved from Associated Artists Productions (AAP/UA). It has been released on DVD by the Warner Archive Collection. A copy is held by the Library of Congress.

References

External links
 
 
 
 Screen cap and title card(Wayback Machine)

1930 films
1930 crime drama films
American action films
American crime drama films
American legal drama films
American black-and-white films
1930s English-language films
American films based on plays
Films directed by Ray Enright
First National Pictures films
Warner Bros. films
Films scored by Louis Silvers
1930s action films
1930s American films